The Duplin River is an  tidal river in McIntosh County, Georgia, in the United States.  It flows from north to south along the western edge of Sapelo Island into Doboy Sound, an arm of the Atlantic Ocean.

See also
List of rivers of Georgia

References 

Rivers of Georgia (U.S. state)
Rivers of McIntosh County, Georgia